Károly Fatér (9 April 1940 – 19 September 2020) was a Hungarian footballer. He was born in Veszprém County. He competed at the 1968 Summer Olympics in Mexico City, where he won a gold medal with the Hungarian team.

References

External links

1940 births
2020 deaths
Sportspeople from Veszprém County
Hungarian footballers
Olympic footballers of Hungary
Footballers at the 1968 Summer Olympics
Olympic gold medalists for Hungary
Olympic medalists in football
Medalists at the 1968 Summer Olympics
Association football goalkeepers
Hungary international footballers
Csepel SC footballers
Pénzügyőr SE footballers
Budafoki LC footballers